Eunkwang Girls' High School is a private girls high school located in Gangnam-gu, Seoul, South Korea.

Foundation 

Eunkwang High School and Eunkwang Middle School, two co-educational schools, were established by Kang-Mok Lee in 1946 under the spirit of Christianity. In 1973, the name was changed to Eunkwang Girls' High School and Eunkwang Girls' Middle School. The educational foundation for both schools was named Eunkwang Private Educational Institute. This name was also changed to Kuk-Am Private Educational Institute.

Symbols 

The school's motto is "adventurous man of the future world, creative intellectual, independent volunteer". The school's flower is Korean rosebay, and the tree is pine.

Academic information 

Entering their sophomore year, students are to choose between liberal arts courses and general science courses. The classes are divided according to their selection of subjects. All students are required to learn at least one other foreign language than English, and students need to decide between Chinese or Japanese.

References

External links
 

Education in Seoul
Educational institutions established in 1946
Girls' schools in South Korea
High schools in South Korea
1946 establishments in Korea